Colin Bryan McGrath (born November 21, 1975) is an American college basketball coach, most recently the  head coach at UNC Wilmington. McGrath previously served under Roy Williams as an assistant coach with the University of North Carolina.  Born in Indianapolis, Indiana, but raised in Topeka, Kansas, McGrath started out as a player for Williams at Kansas and had not left Roy's bench since becoming an assistant at Kansas and following North Carolina.

On April 3, 2017 McGrath was named head coach at UNC Wilmington following the conclusion of North Carolina's season.

On January 13, 2020 UNCW relieved McGrath of his duties following a 5-14 start to the 2019-2020 season with just two of those wins coming against Division 1 competition.

Head coaching record

References

External links
 UNC Wilmington profile

1975 births
Living people
American men's basketball players
Basketball coaches from Kansas
Basketball players from Kansas
Kansas Jayhawks men's basketball players
North Carolina Tar Heels men's basketball coaches
Sportspeople from Topeka, Kansas
UNC Wilmington Seahawks men's basketball coaches